Lancaster's campaign may refer to:

Gascon campaign of 1345, an English offensive led by Henry, Duke of Lancaster, in Gascony during the Hundred Years' War
Lancaster's chevauchée of 1346, an English offensive led by Henry, Duke of Lancaster, in southwest France during the Hundred Years' War
Lancaster's Normandy chevauchée of 1356, an English offensive led by Henry, Duke of Lancaster, in Normandy during the Hundred Years' War
Lancaster's Loire campaign of 1356, an English offensive led by Henry, Duke of Lancaster, in northwest France during the Hundred Years' War